The Ancient Mariner is a 1925 American silent fantasy drama film based on the popular 1798 poem, The Rime of the Ancient Mariner by Samuel Taylor Coleridge. The film was directed by Henry Otto and Chester Bennett, and it was adapted for the screen by Eve Unsell. The film stars Clara Bow, Gladys Brockwell, Nigel De Brulier and was distributed by Fox Film Corporation.  The film is presumed to be lost.

Synopsis
The official plot synopsis, as provided by the Fox Film Corporation to the copyright registration office and then entered at the Library of Congress:

Cast
Modern sequences (directed by Chester Bennett):
Clara Bow as Doris
Leslie Fenton as Joe Barlow
Nigel De Brulier as Skipper
Earle Williams as Victor Brandt
Ancient Mariner sequences (directed by Henry Otto):
Gladys Brockwell as Life In Death 
Robert Klein as Death 
Paul Panzer as Mariner

Background
The publicity department at Fox Films launched a special campaign to promote the film, by sending several "exploitation men" to cover every major area of the country. The campaign blitz included sending sales letters, pamphlets and posters to schools, academies, libraries and literary associations across the country. Close to a hundred thousand bookmarks were distributed to public libraries, with a message promoting the film as a Christmas attraction. A seven-colored half-sheet lithograph, produced by noted Spanish artist Luis Usabal, was distributed to societies who posted them in their reading rooms and other common areas. Fox also sponsored an “Ancient Mariner Essay Contest” in almost 100 newspapers, for students in public, private and parochial schools and academies, which included monetary prizes and free film tickets for the best essay on the subject. The film spent eight months in production, and turned out to be a moderately expensive production that eventually lost $33,000 for the company.

Gustave Doré, a widely known illustrator, made a complete set of drawings for the poem The Rime of the Ancient Mariner, and it was these drawings that many of the scenes of the film were based.

Reviews and reception
Hal Erickson opined in his review that Coleridge's poem had no love interest, which indicated that Eve Unsell did an "extensive rewrite" for the film adaption. George T. Pardy wrote in his review for Motion Picture News that "this production registers as a charming example of screen artistry". Pardy praised film director Henry Otto, saying that he "succeeded in conveying the subtle sense of its bizarre mystery and supernatural lure in a series of scenes that are remarkable for superb lighting effects and magical appeal". Pardy also noted that Panzer and De Brullier's performances were "outstanding". An anonymous reviewer for the Philadelphia Bulletin wrote at the time, "except for a bit of slowness in the unwinding of the theme, the cinema version of Coleridge's famous poem is an entertaining photoplay". Another anonymous review in the Public Ledger said the film "is divided into a modern story and an allegory, and it is in the latter that the picture is most realistic and impressive".

See also
 Rime of the Ancient Mariner (film) (1975)
The Rime of the Ancient Mariner in popular culture
List of Fox Film films
Lost film
List of lost films
1937 Fox vault fire

References

External links

1925 films
Silent fantasy drama films
American silent feature films
American black-and-white films
Lost American films
Films based on works by Samuel Taylor Coleridge
Films based on poems
Films directed by Henry Otto
Films directed by Chester Bennett
American fantasy drama films
1920s fantasy drama films
1925 lost films
Lost fantasy drama films
Fox Film films
1925 drama films
1920s American films
Silent American drama films
1920s English-language films